Adolf VIII may refer to:

 Adolf VIII of Berg (c. 1240 – 1296)
 Adolphus VIII, Count of Holstein (1401–1459)